Anand Desai-Barochia  is a British actor known for his role as Janzo in the fantasy-adventure drama television series The Outpost and Bridgerton. Desai-Barochia and  Piryanka Chopra's joint campaign with Bumble India premiered August 13th, 2018. The print campaign subsequently aired shortly after and can still be seen across India today. (2023)

Early life and career
Anand Desai-Barochia was born in Nunthorpe, Middlesbrough, North Yorkshire, July 3 to a mother who was a neuroradiologist and a father in the hotel industry. He is of Indian descent.

Desai-Barochia first taste of acting came at ten years old in School, the teacher gave him the lead role in the graduating play. Desai-Barochia also learned to play the piano to a reasonable standard.
At sixteen years of age, after completing his education at Nunthorpe Grammar School, Desai-Barochia auditioned and won a full scholarship to the Italia Conti Academy of Theatre Arts in London. After graduating, he moved to Los Angeles in 2010 to study at the Lee Strasburg Theatre & Film Institute.

Desai-Barochia made his screen debut in 2011 as a choir boy in Skins, and land small parts in The Fresh Beat Band ,  Days of Our Lives and the 2013 film Cavemen.
He secured a larger role as Vikram in the movie The Tiger Hunter in 2016, which premiered at the Laemmle Monica Film Center in Santa Monica, California in 2017  and has appeared in 3 episodes of Emmerdale as Sunil Batth in 2017 to 2018. His most successful role to date has been to play the character Janzo the oddball brewer/alchemist  in 49 episodes of  The CW's The Outpost from 2018 to 2020. Desai-Barochia has worked alongside Jessica Green who plays Talon, and Jake Stormoen who plays Garret for two seasons, with a third series filmed in Serbia in late 2020.

In 2020, Desai-Barochia appeared in the Netflix period drama Bridgerton as Lord Hardy.

Desai-Barochia was promoted to Associate Producer by The CW for an extended 13 episodes of series 3 of The Outpost in 2021. The same year Desai-Barochia Signed with Innovative Artists.

Charity work 
Desai-Barochia costars alongside Piryanka Chopra empowring women in India through their joint campaign with Bumble. The campaign was incredibly successful in championing women to have a voice in a country that hasn’t always been so accepting of females at the helm. In India the term “loose” has long been used to denigrate women who choose not to conform to traditional gender norms. Since launch, there have now been over 18 million interactions with women making the first move on Bumble India. (2021)

Filmography

Film

Television

Self

References

External links 

Anand Desai-Barochia Instagram
Anand Desai-Barochia twitter
Interview on Good Morning LALA Land

21st-century British actors
British male film actors
British male television actors
British male stage actors
Actors from Middlesbrough
Alumni of the Italia Conti Academy of Theatre Arts
People from Middlesbrough
Living people
Year of birth missing (living people)